Camp Lemonnier is a United States Naval Expeditionary Base, situated next to Djibouti–Ambouli International Airport in Djibouti City, and home to the Combined Joint Task Force – Horn of Africa (CJTF-HOA) of the U.S. Africa Command (USAFRICOM). It is the only permanent U.S. military base in Africa. The camp is operated by U.S. Navy Region Europe, Africa, Southwest Asia; CJTF-HOA is the most notable tenant command located at the facility as of 2008.

Camp Lemonnier was originally established as garrison for the French Foreign Legion. The base was leased by Djibouti to the United States in 2002, along with the right to use the neighboring airport and port facilities. The base supports Operation Enduring Freedom – Horn of Africa (OEF-HOA) and is the centerpiece of a network of around six U.S. drone and surveillance bases stretching across the continent. The latter air bases are smaller and operate from remote hangars situated within local military bases or civilian airports. Due to its strategic location, Camp Lemonnier also serves as a hub for aerial operations in the Persian Gulf region.

Djibouti is strategically located by the Bab-el-Mandeb Strait, which separates the Gulf of Aden from the Red Sea and controls the approaches to the Suez Canal. As a result, the country hosts many other foreign military bases, including a Chinese naval base, a French airbase, an Italian Support Base and a Japanese base. Unlike French troops, who are allowed to enter Djibouti city and interact with the locals, US troops may only leave Camp Lemonnier by special permission, and most of Djibouti City is off limits.

History
Camp Lemonnier is located in the town of Ambouli on the southern side of the Djibouti–Ambouli International Airport, between the runway overflow areas and a French military munitions storage facility. After use by the French Foreign Legion, the facility was operated by the Djibouti Armed Forces.

Lemonnier originally belonged to the French military, and was named after General Émile-René Lemonnier. Commander of the 3rd Brigade of the Tonkin Division, led with fierce energy the resistance to the Japanese coup d'état in French Indochina. In 2009, after years of misspelling, the U.S. Navy officially changed the camp's name to properly reflect the spelling of General Lemonnier's name.

Following the September 11, 2001 attacks, the U.S. decided to start counter-terrorism efforts. At first, this was limited to focused attacks, but in 2002 the U.S. government realized that to reduce extremism would require long term engagement with the local governments and populations. As a result, it established the Combined Joint Task Force-Horn of Africa to conduct stability operations in the area. In November 2002, the CJTF-HOA staff, a Marine-based organization, arrived off the coast of Djibouti aboard , a naval command ship. Djiboutian workers were instrumental in preparing the newly renovated  camp for movement of the CJTF headquarters ashore. More than 1,200 local and third-country national construction and support personnel currently work at the camp. KBR administers the contract for facilities and support operations for the camp.

A Marine Corps FAST team were the initial force to occupy Camp Lemonier in June 2002 and provide security while Army Special Forces Logistics specialists (SOT-A) planned the development to receive more forces. Initial Command and Control was established under SOCCENT by a US Air Force Special Operations command element. The initial US combat forces started with Air Force MC-130s and MH-53s who redeployed from Jacobabab, Pakistan, followed shortly by 7th SFG soldiers and an Army Tank Support Battalion for base support. While the intent was to move ashore, the Camp Lemonnier facilities which had not been in use for several years were in a state of disrepair. Some buildings were concrete shells and had been stripped of interior fixtures, pipes and wiring, while the roofs of several structures had collapsed. Goats roamed the property and birds had taken roost in several of the abandoned structures. The former swimming pool had been used as a trash dump. Some buildings that were closer to the Djiboutian Air Force controlled side of the airport were in better shape and required minimal renovation. As a result, the CJTF-HOA staff remained aboard the USS Mount Whitney as the U.S. Army (Bravo Company, 46th Engineer Battalion (CBT)(HVY)) began renovations. (Camp Physical Security was first established by Marines from 2D Fleet Anti-Terrorism Security Team (FAST Co) and was handed over to the 551st Military Police Company, 101st Airborne Division) This involved building new concrete pads, maintenance facilities and living areas. 
In May 2003, Camp Lemonnier was livable and CJTF-HOA transitioned from the Mount Whitney to the camp. The pool was cleaned, refurbished, and opened in spring of 2003.

Combined Joint Task Force-Horn of Africa (CJTF-HOA) began moving all headquarters personnel and equipment from its flagship, USS Mount Whitney, in the Gulf of Aden, into facilities at Camp Lemonnier on 6 May 2003.

The term of the lease was for five years, with options to renew. As part of the lease and expansion, physical improvements to the camp included fencing, additional billeting to replace existing tents, and compliance with various U.S. force protection standoff requirements.

On 1 July 2006, the U.S. Marine Corps turned over responsibility for Camp Lemonnier to the U.S. Navy in a brief change of command ceremony. U.S. Navy Captain Robert Fahey assumed command of Camp Lemonnier from U.S. Marine Corps Colonel Gerard Fischer.

As part of the process of moving Lemonnier from an "expeditionary" base to a long term facility, the camp built a billeting area with rows of Containerized Living Units (CLUs) with concrete sidewalks and gravel roads. As the CLU area expanded, the camp population moved from tents into the more durable berthing facilities.

Transfer to USAFRICOM 
On 1 October 2008, responsibility for the task force was transferred from the United States Central Command (USCENTCOM) to United States Africa Command (USAFRICOM) as the latter assumed authority over the African theater of operations.

By 2009, the base began expansion again. According to OSGEOINT, the base received a parallel taxi-way and a new auxiliary support apron. In the following year (2011), open source satellite imagery showed Camp Lemmonier with a new drone apron supporting the RQ/MQ-1 Predator. Furthermore, Camp Lemmonier has been described by The Economist as "the most important base for drone operations outside the war zone of Afghanistan", with drones conducting missions in adjacent Yemen and Somalia.

In October 2011, a squadron of USAF F-15E was deployed to the base and have flown numerous combat missions into Yemen in support of both Yemeni government forces and unilateral strikes directed by JSOC and the CIA targeting cells. Along with the UAV's and F-15E's, surveillance flights are conducted by Air Force Special Operations Command U-28As, that are outfitted with sophisticated signals intercept equipment and optical sensors, which can provide real-time intelligence for ground operators.

On 25 January 2012, US officials confirmed that US Navy SEALs had rescued two foreign hostages in Somalia, an American woman and Danish man, taking them to Camp Lemonnier. Demining workers, the captives had been abducted on 25 October 2011 in the north-central Galkayo area, allegedly by gunmen operating on behalf of a private source who threatened to sell them to Al-Shabaab if their demands were not met.

As of May 2013, the US had prepared plans for a $1.4 billion expansion of the base and to increase its special forces there to more than 1,000.

In 2013, the UAV's operating out of the base were moved to Chabelley Airport – which increased operational security and allayed local fears after a UAV and its Hellfire missile crashed in a Djibouti suburb.

In May 2014, U.S. President Obama and Djiboutian President Guelleh agreed on a 20-year extension of the American lease, at $63 million a year in rent – about double its previous rate. The US is in the process of expanding the base and plans to spend $1.4 billion upgrading the facility over the next two decades.

In 2017, China opened a base nearby, the Chinese People's Liberation Army Support Base in Djibouti. In May 2018, the United States Air Force said military grade lasers had been aimed at the eyes of its pilots and the incidents had originated on the Chinese base. China denied that they were the source of the lasers, stating that they abide by international law.

Base of Operations

Camp Lemonnier became the hub for black and white SOF operations into nations such as Somalia and Yemen. Also based there is the SOCCE-HOA (Special Operations Command and Control Element-Horn of Africa) – which commands all SOCOM units assigned to training or operational missions in the region including elements of JSOTF-TS (Joint Special Operations Task Force-Trans Sahara) and Naval Special Warfare Unit 10. It also coordinates a rotational detachment of US Army Special Forces which conducts foreign Internal Defence training in counterinsurgency in both Djibouti and in countries such as Mali. In a separate secure compound within the base there are an estimated 300 JSOC personnel: special operators, intelligence and imagery analysts and a dedicated UAV cell. The UAV cell is commanded by a JSOC Major and tasks a flight of 8 MQ-1 Predators conducting operations over Somalia, Mali and Yemen, the Predators have been carrying out strikes and surveillance missions from Camp Lemonnier since late 2010. Prior to that, both CIA and JSOC had used the base as a temporary forward location for Predator and Reaper sorties into the region.

Tenant commands

Ground forces

Camp Lemonnier is operated by Commander, Navy Region Europe, Africa, Southwest Asia, which is responsible for its expansion, upkeep, and logistics support. Tenant units include the U.S. Marine Security Forces which provides the camp's external security, the CJTF-HOA commander and staff, a U.S. Navy Seabee battalion which conducts water-well drilling operations, U.S. Army units which provide additional security, military training, and Civil-military operations support, and several aircraft detachments.

Past tenant units have included the U.S. Marine 8th and 9th Provisional Security Force (PSC), U.S. Army 2nd Battalion, 18th Field Artillery Regiment, U.S. Army 1st Battalion, 65th Infantry Regiment, U.S. Army 1st Battalion, 16th Infantry Regiment, U.S. Air Force First Red Horse Group, U.S. Army 2nd Battalion, 137th Infantry Regiment, U.S. Army 3rd Squadron, 124th Cavalry Regiment, and U.S. Army 2nd Battalion, 138th Field Artillery Regiment.

Aviation units

The 449th Air Expeditionary Group is U.S. Air Force component to CJTF-HOA and is assigned to Camp Lemonnier. The 449th AEG is currently composed of HC-130P Hercules COMBAT KING or HC-130J COMBAT KING II aircraft assigned to the 81st Expeditionary Rescue Squadron and pararescuemen assigned to the 82nd Expeditionary Rescue Squadron. While deployed the group performed both combat and civil search and rescue missions.

 thumb | right | Mud, sand, and grass may carry pests and weed seeds to equipment's next berthing upon leaving Djibouti
Aircraft detachments include a U.S. Marine heavy-lift helicopter (CH-53) detachment, a U.S. Marine assault-support MV-22 Osprey detachment, a U.S. Navy P-8 Poseidon detachment (technically a part of the US Navy's 6th Fleet – Commander Task Force 67), USAF aircraft include HC-130P COMBAT KING or HC-130J COMBAT KING II, HH-60G Pave Hawk, C-130J Hercules and, at times, a C-17 Globemaster III detachment.

Other

Customs inspections for exotic organisms is the responsibility of the Navy Logistics team.

See also 

 Chinese naval base in Djibouti
 Japan Self-Defense Force Base Djibouti
List of United States military bases
List of United States Navy airfields

References

External links

 

United States Navy installations
Military installations established in 2002
Djibouti–United States relations
Overseas or abroad military installations
Foreign relations of Djibouti
2002 establishments in Djibouti